Mangifera blommesteinii is a species of plant in the family Anacardiaceae. It is a tree found in Peninsular Malaysia and Borneo.

References

blommesteinii
Trees of Peninsular Malaysia
Trees of Borneo
Endangered plants
Taxonomy articles created by Polbot
Taxa named by André Joseph Guillaume Henri Kostermans